Vibeke Videm (born 1957) is a professor of clinical and molecular medicine at the Norwegian University of Science and Technology (NTNU) in Trondheim, Norway, where she specializes in inflammation and immunology.  She also is a senior physician at St. Olav's University Hospital.

She received her medical degree from the University of Oslo Faculty of Medicine in 1981. She was a Fulbright Visiting Scholar (2003-2004).

Publications 
 Videm's publications in PubMed

References

1957 births
Living people
Academic staff of the Norwegian University of Science and Technology
People from Bærum
Norwegian women physicians
Norwegian medical researchers
Norwegian immunologists
Women immunologists
University of Oslo alumni